Frank Hayostek (June 11, 1924 – November 15, 2009) was an American veteran of World War II who gained international notoriety for throwing a message in an aspirin bottle that traveled all the way from the New York harbor to Dingle Ireland. The event became a media circus on both sides of the Atlantic.

On Christmas, 1945, Medical Corpsman Frank Hayostek returned by sea from military duty in France.  Feeling lonesome, he stuffed a note into an aspirin bottle, corked it and tossed it over the side of the SS James Ford Rhodes.  The note read: "Dear Finder, I am an American soldier . .. 21 years old . . . just a plain American of no wealth, but just enough to get along with. This is my third Christmas from home . . . God bless you."

Eight months later Hayostek received a response from Breda O'Sullivan, 18-year-old resident of Lispole.  The pair became pen pals and over the course of the next seven years they exchanged 70 letters.  In the summer of 1952 Hayostek traveled to County Kerry to finally meet O'Sullivan.  His two-week stay was shadowed by a flock of reporters and photographers who "tried to fan the romance into flame."

The publicity was too much for the shy O'Sullivan who would later describe the notoriety as "gruelling" and Hayostek returned to Pennsylvania without her.  In 1958 he married a local girl and had a son named Terry Francis Hayostek. The following year he received his last letter from Breda.  His wife died in 1965 from cancer.

The Tribune Democrat rekindled the story in 2004.

Frank Hayostek died on November 15, 2009, at the age of 85.

In 2012 to coincide with the 60th anniversary of Frank's trip to Ireland, RTÉ Radio (Irish National Radio) announced it was making a documentary titled 'Message in a Bottle' for its award-winning Doc on One series. It was revealed on this programme that Frank had told Breda he had been previously married and had the marriage annulled. Breda then spurned him as she held very strong Catholic views on marriage.

References

1924 births
2009 deaths
United States Navy personnel of World War II
United States Navy sailors